Britford Water Meadows is a biological Site of Special Scientific Interest at Britford, south of Salisbury in Wiltshire.

Sources
 Natural England citation sheet for the site (accessed 22 March 2022)

External links
 Natural England website (SSSI information)

Sites of Special Scientific Interest in Wiltshire
Sites of Special Scientific Interest notified in 1975
Meadows in Wiltshire